Spring Point can refer to: 
Spring Point Township, Cumberland County, Illinois, United States
Spring Point, Antarctica
Spring Point, Bahamas, the largest community on the island of Acklins
Spring Point Airport
Spring Point, a community in the Municipal District of Willow Creek No. 26, Alberta, Canada